Sono Sachiko (園祥子) (December 23, 1867 – July 7, 1947) was the fifth concubine of Emperor Meiji of Japan. Although Meiji was the last Japanese emperor to have more than one consort, the official role at court was not abolished until 1924; surviving concubines remained as members of the imperial family in retirement. In 2005 Prince Tomohito of Mikasa urged the revival of concubinage to address problems related to male-only primogeniture in the current order of Japanese imperial succession.

Sachiko's father was Count Sono Motosachi (園基祥); she was known as Kogiku Tenji (小菊典侍). She gave birth to two sons and six daughters, several of whom died prematurely. Her children with Emperor Meiji include the following members of the Japanese imperial family:
Princess Hisanomiya Shizuko-naishinnō (久宮静子内親王, February 10, 1886 – April 4, 1887)
Prince Akinomiya Michihito-shinnō (昭宮猷仁親王, August 22, 1887 – November 12, 1888)
Princess Masako Takeda (常宮昌子内親王, September 30, 1888 – March 8, 1940)
Princess Fusako Kitashirakawa (周宮房子内親王, January 28, 1890 – August 11, 1974)
Princess Nobuko Asaka (富美宮允子内親王, August 7, 1891 – November 3, 1933)
Prince Mitsunomiya Teruhito-shinnō (満宮輝仁親王, November 30, 1893 – August 17, 1894)
Princess Toshiko Higashikuni (泰宮聡子内親王, May 11, 1896 – March 5, 1978)
Princess Sadanomiya Takiko-naishinnō (貞宮多喜子内親王, September 24, 1897 – January 11, 1899)
Following the death of Emperor Meiji in 1912, Sachiko became a member of the household of Empress Teimei, the consort of Emperor Taishō. She attended the birth of Takahito, Prince Mikasa in 1915.

Her tomb is at Saikōan Temple in Shinjuku, Tokyo.

See also
Empress Shōken, primary consort of Emperor Meiji, later Empress Dowager
Hamuro Mitsuko (葉室光子), first concubine
Hashimoto Natsuko (橋本夏子), second concubine
Yanagiwara Naruko, third concubine of Emperor Meiji, mother of Emperor Taishō
Chigusa Kotoko (千種任子), fourth concubine

References 

Imperial House of Japan
1867 births
1947 deaths
Japanese concubines
Emperor Meiji